The 2022 United States House of Representatives election in Vermont was held on November 8, 2022, to elect the U.S. representative from . The election coincided with other elections to the House of Representatives, elections to the U.S. Senate, as well as various other state and local elections.

Incumbent Democrat Peter Welch was re-elected with 67.3% of the vote in 2020. After eight-term U.S. Senator Patrick Leahy announced he would retire on November 15, some speculated that Welch may decline to seek re-election and instead seek election to the Senate. On November 22, 2021, Welch announced his candidacy for Leahy's seat, creating the first open U.S. House seat in Vermont since Bernie Sanders ran for the U.S. Senate in 2006.

Democratic nominee Becca Balint won the election in a landslide, becoming the first elected female member of the United States Congress in the state's history. Her primary opponent in the general election, Liam Madden, won the Republican nomination but identifies as an independent who opposes the two-party system. Madden stated that he would not caucus with House Republicans if elected to Congress; the Vermont Republican Party later disavowed his campaign. Ericka Redic, who lost the Republican primary to Madden, ran in the general election as the nominee of the Libertarian Party.

Vermont was the last remaining state that had never elected a woman to Congress after Mississippi elected its first woman in 2018. With Balint's victory, every state has now been represented in Congress by a woman at some point.

Democratic primary

Candidates

Nominee
Becca Balint, state senator (2015–present) and Vermont Senate president pro tempore (2021–present)

Eliminated in primary
Molly Gray, Lieutenant Governor of Vermont (2021–present)
Louis Meyers, physician at Rutland Regional Medical Center

Withdrew
Kesha Ram Hinsdale, state senator (2021–present) and candidate for lieutenant governor in 2016 (endorsed Balint; running for re-election)
Sianay Chase Clifford, former aide to U.S. Representative Ayanna Pressley

Declined 
T. J. Donovan, Vermont Attorney General (2017–2022)
Jill Krowinski, Speaker of the Vermont House of Representatives (2021–present)
Deborah Markowitz, former Vermont Secretary of State (1999-2011)
Tanya Vyhovsky, state representative (2021–present) (running for state senate)
Peter Welch, incumbent U.S. Representative (2007–present) (running for U.S. Senate)

Endorsements

Polling
Graphical summary

Results

Republican primary

Candidates

Nominee
Liam Madden, former leader of About Face: Veterans Against the War

Eliminated in primary
Ericka Redic, businesswoman and community activist
Anya Tynio, sales representative, nominee for this district in 2018 and candidate in 2020

Declined
Felisha Leffler, state representative (2019–present)
Heidi Scheuermann, state representative (2007–present)
Phil Scott, Governor of Vermont (2017–present) (running for re-election)

Polling

Results
Liam Madden won the primary in a surprise victory, as Redic was considered the frontrunner. The Vermont Republican Party disavowed Madden's campaign following a meeting with him on August 15, less than a week after his victory in the primary, citing his refusal to commit to caucusing with the Republican Party if he won the election. Redic announced that she would continue her campaign into the general election as the candidate of the Libertarian Party of Vermont.

Progressive primary

Candidates

Withdrew after winning primary 
Barbara Nolfi, clinic co-founder

Declined
Tanya Vyhovsky, state representative (2021–present) (running for state senate)

Results

Independents and other parties

Candidates

Declared 
Matt Druzba (Independent)
Adam Ortiz
Ericka Redic (Libertarian), businesswoman and community activist (previously Republican)
Luke Talbot

Withdrawn 
Bryan Braga (Communist)

General election

Predictions

Polling

Becca Balint vs. Marcia Horne

Sianay Chase Clifford vs. Marcia Horne

Molly Gray vs. Marcia Horne

Kesha Ram vs. Marcia Horne

Results

Notes

References

External links
Campaign websites
 Becca Balint (D) for Congress
 Matt Druzba (I) for Congress
 Liam Madden (R) for Congress
 Ericka Redic (L) for Congress

2022
Vermont
United States House of Representatives